Artyom Mikhaylovich Karpukas (born 13 June 2002) is a Russian football player who plays for FC Lokomotiv Moscow.

Club career
He made his debut in the Russian Premier League for FC Lokomotiv Moscow on 17 April 2022 in a game against PFC Sochi.

International career
Karpukas was called up to the Russia national football team for the first time in November 2022 for friendly games against Tajikistan and Uzbekistan.

Career statistics

References

External links
 
 
 
 

2002 births
People from Biysk
Sportspeople from Altai Krai
Living people
Russian footballers
Russia under-21 international footballers
Association football midfielders
FC Lokomotiv Moscow players
Russian Second League players
Russian Premier League players